British Rail Class 93 is the traction classification assigned to the electric locomotives that were to enter service as part of British Rail (BR)'s InterCity 250 project on the West Coast Main Line (WCML).

The locomotives would have been derived from the Class 91 locomotives that entered service on the East Coast Main Line in 1989, and would thus have traced a lineage back to the Advanced Passenger Train (APT) that was planned to run on the WCML more than a decade earlier.

Tenders to construct the locomotives and rolling stock were issued in March 1991, with an expected in service date of 1995; it was envisaged that up to 30 complete trains would be initially required, with a total cost estimated at £380 million. However, the cancellation of the InterCity 250 project in July 1992 meant that the rolling stock orders were never made.

Speed and aerodynamic properties 

The maximum speed however would initially have been  because of signalling and track alignment limitations.

Limited funding 
The InterCity 250 project was to be the next major infrastructure project following the East Coast Main Line electrification and delivery of the Intercity 225s. However, BR was also beginning a major upgrade of its suburban and commuter Electric Multiple Unit (EMU) rolling stock on Network SouthEast, with the introduction of the Networker series as well as the construction of the Channel Tunnel lines. As a consequence, funding was limited. This meant that the £380 million for the locomotives added to the required cost of upgrades to the WCML infrastructure was not available. So due to this and other complications, the project was scrapped.

Legacy 
A life-size mock-up of the Class 93 is on display at the Midland Railway – Butterley in Swanwick and a 1:20 scale model is displayed in the Warehouse in the National Railway Museum, York. Prior to the recent announcement of Agility Trains as the preferred bidder for the Intercity Express Programme a number of commentators called for the InterCity 250 / Class 93 idea to be revived as the basis for replacement rolling stock on the East Coast Main Line. Even though the Class 93s were never built, the traction characteristics of the locomotives were used in Railtrack WCML feasibility studies to determine the electrification requirements for an upgraded line. Virgin Trains (the operators of the InterCity West Coast franchise after privatisation) consequently ordered new rolling stock for the route, albeit EMUs rather than loco-hauled stock.

See also
 British Rail Class 93 (Stadler)

References

External links 

93
High-speed trains of the United Kingdom
Abandoned trains of the United Kingdom
Standard gauge locomotives of Great Britain